Beatrice Wellington (born 15 June 1907 – died 1971) was a Canadian woman who worked to evacuate children from Prague during the early stages of the German occupation in World War II overseeing the operation of the Kindertransport from Czechoslovakia.

Life and work 
Beatrice Gonzales was a Quaker who was born 15 June 1907 in Canada. Her father abandoned the family when she was young and her stepfather, George Wellington, insisted over her objections that Beatrice adopt his last name. When she applied for her first Canadian passport to travel abroad he made sure her last name was listed as Wellington, something she resented for many years. Before she died, while teaching in Edmonton, Alberta, she changed her name back to Gonzales.

Wellington enrolled at the University of British Columbia at the age of 17, and was a 1927 graduate in English and History. She immediately took a job teaching Port Gray Junior High School (1928–1931) and then high school in Chilliwack (1931–1936). 

To see for herself the nature of the growing conflicts in Europe in the mid-1930s, Wellington took a year's leave of absence from teaching and went to Geneva, Switzerland, though the details of her employment remain obscure. A 1938 report  from a Vancouver newspaper said that she "was appointed to take charge of a YWCA summer camp in Czechoslovakia." 

Living in Prague during the fall of 1938, Beatrice, a Canadian who held a British passport, was able to work independently of any agency to acquire documents from Gestapo officials to allow children to leave Prague for England on Kindertransports that she organized. Using a similar tactic, she was also able to acquire documents for adults and families who were unable to get exit visas themselves.

After her death in 1971, her family endowed the Beatrice Wellington Gonzales Memorial Scholarship at the University of British Columbia and cited "[Wellington's] strenuous and successful efforts to protect and salvage the lives of political refugees in Europe prior to and during World War II. In making this award, special consideration will be given to students who like Miss Gonzales are concerned about the plight of individuals."

References

1907 births
1971 deaths
Female resistance members of World War II
Canadian activists
Canadian women activists
Kindertransport
University of British Columbia alumni